Eucalyptus arenacea, commonly known as the desert stringybark or sand stringybark, is a tree or a mallee that is endemic to south-eastern Australia. It has rough bark to the thinnest branches, lance-shaped or curved adult leaves, club-shaped flower buds arranged in groups of between seven and fifteen, white flowers and hemispherical to more or less spherical fruit.

Description
It has rough, fibrous and stringy bark on its trunk and to the thinnest branches. Flowering mainly occurs between December and January and the flowers are white.

Taxonomy and naming
Eucalyptus arenacea was first formally described in 1988 by Julie Marginson and Pauline Ladiges and the description was published in Australian Systematic Botany. The specific epithet (arenacea) is a Latin word meaning "of sand".

Distribution and habitat
Desert stringybark grows on pale-coloured sandhills and on sandplains between Keith, Pinaroo and Bordertown in the Ninety Mile Desert in South Australia and in the Little Desert and Big Desert areas of Victoria.

See also
List of Eucalyptus species

References

Trees of Australia
arenacea
Myrtales of Australia
Flora of Victoria (Australia)
Plants described in 1988